Calvin Leon Russell (born June 14, 1983) is a former American football wide receiver. He was signed by the Green Bay Packers as an undrafted free agent in 2008. He played college football at Tuskegee.

Russell was also a member of the Columbus Destroyers, Florida Tuskers, Cincinnati Bengals and Virginia Destroyers.

External links
Just Sports Stats

1983 births
Living people
Sportspeople from Fulton County, Georgia
Players of American football from Georgia (U.S. state)
American football wide receivers
Tuskegee Golden Tigers football players
Green Bay Packers players
People from Fairburn, Georgia
Columbus Destroyers players
Florida Tuskers players
Cincinnati Bengals players
Virginia Destroyers players